Chondrostoma prespense is a species of ray-finned fish in the family Cyprinidae.
It is endemic to the Prespa Lakes in Albania, Greece, and North Macedonia.
Its natural habitats are rivers and freshwater lakes.
It is threatened by habitat loss.

References

Chondrostoma
Freshwater fish of Europe
Fish described in 1924
Taxa named by Stanko Karaman
Taxonomy articles created by Polbot